In public transport, Route 7 may refer to:

Route 7 (MTA Maryland), a bus route in Baltimore, Maryland
Barcelona Metro line 7
Line 7, Beijing Subway
London Buses route 7
Line 7 (Madrid Metro)
7 (New York City Subway service)
Line 7, Shanghai Metro
Helsinki tram route 7
Stockholm tram route 7, 'Spårväg City'

7